Jimmy Anderson may refer to:

Jimmy Anderson (football manager) (born before 1908), English football manager
Jimmy Anderson (footballer, born 1913) (1913–1993), English football left back
Jimmy Anderson (footballer, born 1932), Scottish footballer
Jimmy Anderson (musician) (born 1932), Muscogee American painter, musician and preacher
Jimmy Anderson (boxer) (born 1942), British boxer
Jimmy Anderson (bullfighter) (1953–2008), American bullfighter
Jimmy Anderson (baseball) (born 1976), American MLB player
James Anderson (cricketer) (born 1982), English cricketer also known as Jimmy Anderson
Jimmy P. Anderson (born 1986), American politician from Wisconsin

See also
James Anderson (disambiguation)
Jim Anderson (disambiguation)